Khalil Kola or Khalil Kala may refer to:
 Khalil Kola, Bandpey-ye Sharqi
 Khalil Kola, Lalehabad